CCGS Sipu Muin is a Canadian Coast Guard Type 400 AP1-88 air cushion vehicle (ACV) or hovercraft based at CCG Hovercraft Base Trois-Rivières in Trois-Rivières, Quebec. The vessel was launched and completed in 1998 and entered service the same year. Sipu Main is predominantly used for icebreaking, search and rescue, and for servicing navigational aids in the Lower Saint Lawrence River and St. Lawrence Seaway.

Description
Sipu Muin is a Type 400 BHC AP1-88/400 air cushion vehicle (ACV) or hovercraft, the first of two vessels constructed for the Canadian Coast Guard.

The ACV is powered by four Caterpillar 3416 TTA diesel engines turning two controllable-pitch propellers creating . The hovercraft has a complement of 7 with two officers.

Construction and career
The contract to build Sipu Muin and sister ship  was awarded in May 1996 to GKN Westland. The two hovercraft were built by Hike Metals & Shipbuilding Limited at their yard in Wheatley, Ontario. Sipu Muin was launched in 1998 and completed in August of that year. At the time of construction, Sipu Muin and Siyay were the largest diesel-powered hovercraft in the world. The name Sipu Muin is taken from the Miꞌkmaq phrase meaning "river bear". Sipu Muin entered service in 1998 and is based at Trois-Rivières, Quebec. Sip Muin is predominantly used for icebreaking duties in the Saint Lawrence River and St. Lawrence Seaway along with servicing navigational aids and search and rescue duties. The vessel is registered in Ottawa, Ontario.

Beginning on 10 May 2016, the ACV underwent a six-month refit at Réparations Navales et Industrielles Océan in Quebec City, Quebec. The modernization included hull repairs and modifications to the pilothouse. The electronic navigation suite was upgraded and the fuel bladders and skirting replaced.

See also
 List of equipment of the Canadian Coast Guard

Notes

Citations

References
  
 
 

Hovercraft of the Canadian Coast Guard
Ships built in Ontario
1998 ships
Trois-Rivières
Ships of the Canadian Coast Guard